This is an alphabetical list of baseball players from South Korea who have played in Major League Baseball since 1994. There have been 26 players in total from South Korea.

Current players

Former players

Awards and honors

All-Star selections

Player of the Month
 Shin-soo Choo: September 2008 AL (Cleveland Indians)
 Shin-soo Choo (2): September 2015 AL (Texas Rangers)

Pitcher of the Month
 Chan-ho Park: July 1998 NL (Los Angeles Dodgers)
 Hyun-jin Ryu: May 2019 NL (Los Angeles Dodgers)

Rookie of the Month
 Hee-seop Choi: April 2003 NL (Chicago Cubs)
 Jung-ho Kang: July 2015 NL (Pittsburgh Pirates)

Player of the Week
 Chan-ho Park: September 18–24, 2000 NL (Los Angeles Dodgers)
 Byung-hyun Kim: July 8–14, 2002 NL (Arizona Diamondbacks)
 Shin-soo Choo: April 12–18, 2010 AL (Cleveland Indians)
 Shin-soo Choo (2): September 13–19, 2010 AL (Cleveland Indians)
 Jung-ho Kang: September 5–11, 2016 NL (Pittsburgh Pirates)
 Hyun-jin Ryu: May 6–12, 2019 NL (Los Angeles Dodgers)

Postseason appearances

References

See also 
 List of people of Korean descent
 Lists of Major League Baseball players
 List of current Major League Baseball players by nationality

 
Baseball players
Korea, South